, provisional designation: , is a trans-Neptunian object from the circumstellar disc of the Kuiper belt, located in the outermost region of the Solar System. It was discovered on 10 February 1999, by American astronomers Jane Luu, David Jewitt and Chad Trujillo at Mauna Kea Observatories on the Big Island of Hawaii, United States.

Orbit and classification 

 is candidate to the Haumea family, the only collisional group of trans-Neptunian objects currently determined. It is also sub-classified as a resonant trans-Neptunian object, as it stays in a 4:7 orbital resonance with the ice giant Neptune, which means, that for every seven orbits of Neptune around the Sun, it makes four orbits. It orbits the Sun at a distance of 37.4–50.1 AU once every 289 years and 8 months (105,787 days). Its orbit has an eccentricity of 0.15 and an inclination of 25° with respect to the ecliptic.

Its observation arc begins with its official discovery observation at Mauna Kea in 1999, as no precoveries were taken and no prior identifications were made. As of 2017 its current position is at 46.7 AU from the Sun.

Physical characteristics

Photometry 

Observations with the New Technology Telescope at ESO's La Silla Observatory in Chile in 2008, determined the body's BVRI colors to be 0.770, 0.630 and 1.110 for their respective passbands. Color indices have since been repeatedly measured.

Diameter and albedo 

According to estimates by the Johnston's archive, the Collaborative Asteroid Lightcurve Link and American astronomer Michael Brown,  measures between 420 and 477 kilometers in diameter. It is "probably" a dwarf planet" according to Brown's assessment (see ).

Naming 

As of 2018, this minor planet remains unnamed.

References

External links 
 Asteroid Lightcurve Database (LCDB), query form (info )
 Discovery Circumstances: Numbered Minor Planets (465001)-(470000) – Minor Planet Center
 

469306
Discoveries by Chad Trujillo
Discoveries by Jane Luu
Discoveries by David C. Jewitt
19990210